The Mahaffie Stagecoach Stop and Farm Historic Site, locally known as the Mahaffie Farm, is located in Olathe, Kansas.  The house was originally a stop along the Westport Route of the Santa Fe, Oregon, and California Trails, which originated in nearby Westport, Missouri. The house's heyday came with large numbers of westbound travelers of the 1860s.

The house has now been converted into a museum and gift shop.  It is situated on almost 40 acres (160,000 m2) of land. It frequently hosts American Civil War reenactments, with a focus on events connected to Bleeding Kansas and bushwhackers. There is also an in-house blacksmith and other various era-specific artisans.

The original farm was founded by James Beatty Mahaffie and his wife Lucinda, in 1858. They ran it until 1870 and stayed on the farm until 1886. The existing house was completed by Mahaffie in 1865. It includes two foot thick limestone blocks quarried from the farm itself.

The Mahaffies left their name not only on the museum, but on a street in Olathe, Mahaffie Elementary School, and on a recent subdivision.

Notes

External links 

Stagecoach Stop & Farm Historic Site
Travel Kansas - Mahaffie House information and photos

Oregon Trail
California Trail
Bleeding Kansas
Houses on the National Register of Historic Places in Kansas
Buildings and structures in Olathe, Kansas
Museums in Johnson County, Kansas
Historic house museums in Kansas
Stagecoach stops in the United States
1857 establishments in Kansas Territory
Houses in Johnson County, Kansas
National Register of Historic Places in Johnson County, Kansas